Scotch Creek (Shuswap: Cemetetkwe ) is a small community in British Columbia based on summer tourism located on the shores of Shuswap Lake at the mouth of the creek of the same name.

Traditionally, Cemetetkwe was important for hunting, berry picking, cedar roots and birch bark for baskets.

Scotch Creek is home to one of the most popular parks in the province of British Columbia called Shuswap Lake Provincial Park. The park operates at capacity from early July to Labour Day (early September). The park is situated on the old delta of Scotch Creek and has one kilometre of sandy, pebble beach. The park also offers a large grassy play area, an adventure playground, a large boat launch, and a self-guiding nature trail.

The park is situated directly across from Copper Island, which is located 1.3 kilometres offshore. Scotch Creek has different places that sell supplies, groceries, and many recreational opportunities including bumper boats, mini-golf driving range, go-carts, para-sailing, horseback riding, whitewater rafting, boat and jet-ski rentals are offered by near-by businesses.

References

""

Populated places in the Columbia-Shuswap Regional District
Unincorporated settlements in British Columbia
Shuswap Country
Designated places in British Columbia